Nina Osegueda (born Balvina Osegueda) is a female heavy metal vocalist from Washington, D.C.. is of Catalan and Salvadoran descent.  She is the lead vocalist of A Sound of Thunder. In 2012, A Sound of Thunder released an album under Nightmare Records called Out of the Darkness. The album features Raven's John Gallagher on its signature song, "Out of the Darkness". In 2013, A Sound of Thunder released Time's Arrow (with guest vocalist Blaze Bayley of Iron Maiden/Wolfsbane) under Mad Neptune Records. The album was funded by a successful KickStarter campaign. In 2013, A Sound of Thunder created another KickStarter campaign for the purpose of recording a new album in 2014. The campaign, whose goal began at $10,000, made over $20k in 30 days.

In 2014, Osegueda was featured on CNN and local news WTOP for her weight loss and use of heavy metal to continue living a healthy lifestyle.

A classically trained vocalist, Osegueda also performed with the Washington National Opera, during their 2000–2002 seasons.

In 2009, Osegueda performed as a guest vocalist for Flight of the Valkyries in St. Paul, Minnesota.

In 2010, Osegueda worked as a co-coordinator for Flight of the Valkyries – East and performed with A Sound of Thunder. In the same year, she performed with A Sound of Thunder at the 3rd and last Mandatory Metal show at the State Theater in Falls Church, VA.

In 2013, Osegueda appeared on Benedictum's album OBEY as a guest vocalist for the track "Thornz".

Osegueda is also the former lead vocalist and founding member of Dark Harvest Records signed Blood Corps.

In 2017, A Sound of Thunder became internationally famous for its heavy metal version of the national anthem of Catalonia, "Els segadors".

Discography
 2018 – It Was Metal – A Sound of Thunder (Album)
 2016 – Who Do You Think We Are? – A Sound of Thunder (Album)
 2015 – Tales From The Deadside – A Sound of Thunder (Album)
 2014 – The Lesser Key of Solomon –  A Sound of Thunder (Album)
 2013 – Time's Arrow – A Sound of Thunder (Album)
 2013 – Queen of Hell – A Sound of Thunder (EP)
 2012 – Out of the Darkness – A Sound of Thunder (Album)
 2011 – Metal Renaissance – A Sound of Thunder (Album)
 2010 – Justice at Last – A Sound of Thunder (Single)
 2010 – A Sound of Thunder – A Sound of Thunder (EP)
 2008 – Hollow Point – Blood Corps (EP)

External links
Nina Osegueda at Facebook
Duchess O' Dork at Twitter
A Sound of Thunder A Sound of Thunder (band)
A Sound of Thunder Draw on Sabbath for Inspiration on 'The Day I Die' at Noisecreep

References 

Living people
American women heavy metal singers
American operatic sopranos
1984 births
American people of Catalan descent
21st-century American women singers
21st-century American singers